The Sheard's Mill Covered Bridge is located in East Rockhill Township and Haycock Township, Bucks County, Pennsylvania next to the Levi Sheard Mill. The bridge crosses the Tohickon Creek on Covered Bridge Road.

The bridge was added to the National Register of Historic Places on December 1, 1980.

See also
National Register of Historic Places listings in Bucks County, Pennsylvania
List of bridges on the National Register of Historic Places in Pennsylvania

References

Bridges completed in 1873
Covered bridges in Bucks County, Pennsylvania
Covered bridges on the National Register of Historic Places in Pennsylvania
Bridges in Bucks County, Pennsylvania
Tourist attractions in Bucks County, Pennsylvania
National Register of Historic Places in Bucks County, Pennsylvania
Road bridges on the National Register of Historic Places in Pennsylvania
Wooden bridges in Pennsylvania
Lattice truss bridges in the United States